The Senas of Makwanpur was a kingdom located in the northern parts of the Mithila region of Nepal. For a part of their history, up till 1675, they were subordinate to the Rajas of Darbhanga and paid tribute to them. They were later conquered by Prithvi Narayan Shah during his unification of Nepal in the battle of Makwanpur. 60 Gorkhali soldiers suffered casualties and 400 soldiers died on the side of Makwanpur.

The official language of the Sen kings of Makwanpur was Maithili.

Origins
After the fall of the Sena dynasty in Bengal, it is believed that their descendants proceeded to different parts of the country. It is believed that one family settled in the northern parts of Mithila. The Makwanpur family was founded by a member of the Sena family called Mukundasena who originally settled in Rupanagar in modern-day Saptari district in the first half of the 13th century. He slowly expanded his rule until he reached the Makwanpur region. The kingdom was expanded towards Palpa and afterward reached the region of Rajapur, Tanahun, Lama, Pyuthan, Madariya, Darchha, Risinga, Vinayakpur, and Gulmi. 

The King, Hariharsena, who ruled from 1631 to 1672 adorned himself with the title of Hindupati after capturing the territory of Gondavara which was under a Muslim Nawab.

Inscription of Jagatasena

An inscription belonging to the Makwanpur prince, Jagatasena, was discovered in Janakpur at the Janaki Ram monastery and throws light on the economic condition of the state. The inscription reads:

The inscription details that the Makwanpur kingdom is unable to provide financial assistance to the Janaki Ram monastery.

Reference

History of Nepal
Mithila
16th-century establishments in Nepal